The Solomon Islands national beach soccer team represents Solomon Islands in international beach soccer competitions and is controlled by S.I.F.F, the governing body for football in Solomon Islands.

The team are known as the Bilikiki, or Bilikiki Boys, after a sea bird which inspired "a popular children's song". The team have adopted both the bird and the song, and are "known for performing the song and [related] dance when they win their matches".

They are statistically the best team in Oceania. Ranked fourteenth in the world as of 2010, they have won every regional championship since regional championships began in 2006. Their opening match 7–6 victory over Uruguay (former world finalists) in the 2009 World Cup has been described as "Solomon Islands' biggest achievement so far in a FIFA tournament".

In January 2011, the Bilikiki played a friendly beach soccer match against the Kurukuru, the Solomon Islands national futsal team, which is also one of the most successful teams in Oceania. The Bilikiki won 4–1. Previously, the two teams had met for a friendly futsal match, which the Kurukuru had won 5–3.

Current squad
Correct as of September 2013

Coach: Gideon Omokirio

Achievements
 OFC Beach Soccer Championship: WINNERS
 2006, 2007, 2009, 2013
Note: No 2008 championship – Solomon Islands were automatically selected as the best team in the continent for the world cup)

References

External links
 World Cup Squad
 FIFA Profile
 News related to the Bilikiki, Solomon Times

Oceanian national beach soccer teams
Football in the Solomon Islands
B